Hartzell is a surname. Notable people with the surname include:

Andy Hartzell, American cartoonist
Curt Hartzell (1891–1975), Swedish gymnast
Eric Hartzell (born 1989), American ice hockey player
James Hartzell (1931–2010), American advertising copywriter
Jay Hartzell (born 1969), American economist
Joseph Crane Hartzell (1842–1929), American missionary
Kay Hartzell (1948–2016), United States Coast Guard officer
Oscar Hartzell (1876–1943), American fraudster
Paul Hartzell (born 1953), American baseball player
Robert N. Hartzell (1896-1968), American engineer, founder of Hartzell Propellers
Roy Hartzell (1881–1961), American baseball player
William Hartzell (1837–1903), American politician

Other uses
Hartzell, Missouri, a community in the United States
Hartzell Propeller, an American aircraft propeller manufacturing company